Achalm is a mountain in Reutlingen, Germany. On its top, the ruins of Achalm Castle can be found, ancestral seat of the counts of Achalm, a 13th-century Swabian noble family related to the counts of Urach.

The toponym is from the Old German words Ache (stream) and Alm. A popular etymology connects it to the supposed last words of count Egino.
It is said he wanted to say "Ach Allmächtiger!" (German for "O  Almighty!"), but was only able to say "Ach Allm...".

Mountains and hills of the Swabian Jura